Commercial crime may refer to:

Various types of White-collar crimes
Financial crime
Corporate crime
State-corporate crime
Some types of Organized crime, esp.
Transnational organized crime

See also
:Category:Commercial crimes

 
Crime by type